Nicolae Linguraru is a Romani manele singer.

Musical career
Guță started as a singer and accordionist in the late 1980s, playing lăutărească music. He released his debut album in 1992. Two years later, he released his first mainstream hit – "De când te iubesc pe tine" (english: "Since I've Been Loving You"), featured on his second long-play record. His first album for a foreign audience was released in France, in 1996; while Romanian musical critics hardly had any reaction towards his music, the journalists abroad would show their appreciation and dub his music a very modern fashion of Gypsy jazz (including electric guitars and synthesizers).

Starting around 1998 Guță developed a growing interest in manele music, a club-friendly subgenre of Balkans folk music influenced by Turkish and Arab pop, similar to what is known in former Yugoslavia as turbo-folk and narodna and in Bulgaria as chalga. Guță had an important role in the advancement of manele (which were a fairly new musical trend at that time) and brought in influences from Western pop and hip hop music. Some of his songs are: "Aş renunţa", "Am greșit și eu", "Dacă vrei", and "Doar tu". In 2007, Guță released a cover version of Hari Mata Hari's "Lejla", the third-placed entry in the Eurovision Song Contest 2006, renaming it "Cine ești?" (Who Are You?).

References

Living people
Romanian manele singers
Romani musicians
Romanian accordionists
Romanian Romani people
Lăutari and lăutărească music
21st-century accordionists
Year of birth missing (living people)